Robbah is a district in El Oued Province, Algeria. As of the 2008 census, it has a population of 40,719.

Robbah is a major town in the district. It is surrounded by some small villages such as El Khobna, Nakhla, El Aquila and El Ogla. These villages are widely known for agriculture and animal breeding. Most people in this district are Arabs, coming from the Arab peninsula.

Communes

Robbah District consists of three communes:
Robbah
Nakhla
El Ogla

References 

Districts of El Oued Province